The 2018 Atlantic Coast Conference football season was the 66th season of College Football play for the Atlantic Coast Conference (ACC). It was played from August 30, 2018 until January 2019. The Atlantic Coast Conference consists of 14 members in two divisions. It was part of the 2018 NCAA Division I FBS football season.  The entire 2018 schedule was released on January 17, 2018.

Previous season
Clemson defeated Miami, 38–3, in the ACC Football Championship Game.

Ten teams participated in bowl games in the 2017 season and the league went 4–6 in those games. Two teams participated in New Years 6 Bowls, however both lost.  Clemson lost to Alabama in the 2018 Sugar Bowl, 6–24.  Miami was played in the Orange Bowl as the ACC's other New Years Six team and lost to Wisconsin 24–34.  Louisville lost 27–31 to Mississippi in the TaxSlayer Bowl.  NC State beat Arizona State 52–31 in the Sun Bowl.  Wake Forest won a shootout in the Belk Bowl with Texas A&M, 55–52. Virginia Tech lost 21–30 to Oklahoma State in the Camping World Bowl Virginia lost 7–49 to Navy in the Military Bowl. Iowa defeated Boston College, 20-27, in the Pinstripe Bowl.  Florida State beat Southern Miss 42–13 in the Independence Bowl. Duke beat Northern Illinois 36–14 in the Quick Lane Bowl.

Preseason

ACC Media days

The 2018 ACC Football Kickoff event was held on July 18 & 19 at the Westin Hotel in Charlotte, North Carolina.  On July 6, the ACC announced 28 student athletes from 14 schools that addressed the media at the kickoff event.  Press also released preseason polls (shown below) at the event.

Preseason Poll
The 2018 ACC Preseason Poll was announced following the ACC Football Kickoff event. Clemson and Miami were selected to win the Atlantic Division and Coastal Division, respectively.  Clemson was selected the favorite to win the ACC Championship, receiving 139 out of 148 votes, or 94% of the vote.  The poll was voted on by 148 media members, all of which were in attendance for the ACC Football Kickoff.

ACC Championship Votes

 Clemson – 139
 Miami – 5
 NC State – 2
 Virginia Tech, Florida State – 1

Atlantic Division
 Clemson – 1,031 (145 First place votes)
 Florida State – 789 (1) 
 NC State – 712 (2)
 Boston College – 545
 Louisville – 422
 Wake Forest – 413
 Syracuse – 232

Coastal Division
 Miami – 998 (122)
 Virginia Tech – 838 (16)
 Georgia Tech – 654 (8)
 Duke – 607 (1)
 Pittsburgh – 420
 North Carolina – 370 (1)
 Virginia – 257

Preseason ACC Player of the year
Source:

1 A. J. Dillon (RB) - Boston College - 45 
2 Christian Wilkins (DT) - Clemson - 42  
3 Ryan Finley (QB) - NC State - 37 
4 Cam Akers (RB) - Florida State - 13 
5 Greg Dortch (WR) - Wake Forest – 3 
T6 Joe Giles-Harris (LB) - Duke, TaQuon Marshall (QB) - Georgia Tech – 2 
T8 Zach Allen - (DE) - Boston College, Eric Dungey (QB) - Syracuse, Jaylen Smith (WR) - Louisville, Olamide Zaccheaus (HB) - Virginia – 1

Preseason All Conference Teams

Offense

Defense

Specialist

Source:

Recruiting classes

Coaches

Notes: 
Records shown are prior to the 2018 season.
Years at school includes the 2018 season.

Rankings

Schedule

† denotes Homecoming game

Regular season

Week one

Week two

Week three

Week four

Week five

Week six

Week seven

Week eight

Week nine

Week ten

Week eleven

Week twelve

Week thirteen

Week fourteen

Championship game

ACC vs other conferences

ACC vs Power 5 matchups
This is a list of the power conference teams (Big 10, Big 12, Pac-12, Notre Dame and SEC). Although the NCAA does not consider BYU a "Power Five" school, the ACC considers games against BYU as satisfying its "Power Five" scheduling requirement. The ACC plays in the non-conference games. All rankings are from the current AP Poll at the time of the game.

Records against other conferences

Regular Season

Post Season

Postseason

Bowl games

Rankings are from CFP rankings.  All times Eastern Time Zone.  ACC teams shown in bold.

Awards and honors

Player of the week honors

All Conference Teams

Source:

First Team

Second Team

Third Team

ACC Individual Awards
 

ACC Player of the Year
 Travis Etienne

ACC Rookie of the Year
 Trevor Lawrence

ACC Coach of the Year
 Dabo Swinney

ACC Offensive Player of the Year
 Travis Etienne

ACC Offensive Rookie of the Year
 Trevor Lawrence

Jacobs Blocking Trophy
 Mitch Hyatt
 

ACC Defensive Player of the Year
 Clelin Ferrell

ACC Defensive Rookie of the Year
 Andre Cisco

All-Americans

Consensus

Associated Press

Walter Camp

FWAA

National award winners

 Hunter Renfrow – Burlsworth Trophy
 Christian Wilkins – Campbell Trophy
 Garrett Bradbury – Rimington Trophy
 Clelin Ferrell – Ted Hendricks Award
 Andre Szmyt – Lou Groza Award
 Dabo Swinney – Woody Hayes Award, Bear Bryant Award
 Trevor Lawrence – Archie Griffin Award

Home game attendance

Bold – Exceeded capacity
†Season High

NFL Draft

References